Luis Campos (born 21 July 1962) is a Salvadoran racewalker. He competed in the men's 20 kilometres walk at the 1984 Summer Olympics.

References

1962 births
Living people
Athletes (track and field) at the 1984 Summer Olympics
Salvadoran male racewalkers
Olympic athletes of El Salvador
Place of birth missing (living people)